The House with Closed Shutters is a 1910 American silent drama film directed by  D. W. Griffith and released by the Biograph Company. Prints of The House with Closed Shutters exist in the film archives of the Museum of Modern Art, George Eastman House, and the Library of Congress.

Plot
During the American Civil War a young soldier loses his nerve in battle and runs away to his home to hide. There his sister puts on his uniform, takes her brother's place in the battle, and is killed. Their mother, not wanting the shameful truth to become known, closes all the shutters (hence the film's title) and keeps her son's presence a secret for many years, until two boyhood chums stumble upon the truth.

Cast
 Henry B. Walthall as The Confederate soldier
 Grace Henderson as His mother
 Dorothy West as His sister
 Joseph Graybill as Her suitor
 Charles West as Her suitor
 William J. Butler as The colored servant (credited as W. J. Butler)
 Edwin August
 Verner Clarges as In Lee's Tent
 John T. Dillon as On Porch / At Farewell / In Lee's Tent (credited as Jack Dillon)
 Gladys Egan as On Porch / At Farewell
 Frank Evans as In Lee's Tent
 Francis J. Grandon as In Lee's Tent
 Alfred Paget as On Porch / At Farewell
 Mabel Van Buren as On Porch / At Farewell

Production
The drama was filmed between June 25 and July 2, 1910. Interior scenes were shot at Biograph's studio at 11 East 14th Street in Manhattan, New York, and outdoor footage was taken on location in Fort Lee, New Jersey.

Commentary
Unlike the portrayal of women in film serials where they tend to be in peril and need to be saved, West's "sister" character, while dressed in her brother's uniform, was in control of her situation as she rode over the same dangerous route that her brother had taken in his flight. Her horsemanship is emphasized over the other male riders, as soon as she is on the horse she rides at full speed and she alone among the riders has her horse rear up on its hind legs.

See also
 List of American films of 1910
 1910 in film

References

External links

 

1910 films
1910 drama films
1910 short films
American silent short films
American black-and-white films
American Civil War films
Silent American drama films
Biograph Company films
Films directed by D. W. Griffith
Films shot in Fort Lee, New Jersey
Articles containing video clips
1910s American films